Christian Caulker (born 25 December 1988) is a Sierra Leonean footballer who plays for Maryland Bobcats FC as a goalkeeper.

Family heritage
Christian Caulker is of Sherbro and Creole parentage. Historically intermarriage among Creoles and Sherbros was frequent during the 19th and 20th centuries. Caulker is a descendant of the prominent Sherbro Caulker chieftaincy family of Sherbro and English descent. The Caulkers originate from Bonthe District in Southern Sierra Leone.

Career
The first choice goalkeeper of Sierra Leone National Premier League club F. C. Kallon moved in January 2011 on loan to Västerås SK.

In July 2014, Caulker was suspended indefinitely, along with Ibrahim Koroma, Samuel Barlay and Ibrahim Kargbo over allegations of match-fixing relating to an Africa Cup of Nations qualifier against South Africa which ended 0–0.
His indefinite ban was lifted on 10 March 2015 along with all other players and officials who were suspended. He was still unimpressed saying due to the impact on his reputation, "I am innocent of all the allegations. I only know it is a matter of time the truth will always prevail over falsehood and evil."

International career
Caulker has been the number one goalkeeper for the Leone Stars since making his international debut against Guinea Bissau on 15 October 2007.

He started in all six games for Sierra Leone at the first round group stage of the 2010 World Cup qualifier against Equatorial Guinea, Nigeria and South Africa. Caulker is highly regarded as the best Sierra Leonean goalkeeper at this time. Caulker was the first-choice goalkeeper for Sierra Leone U-17 team and at the 2005 Meridian Cup in Turkey.

References

External links

NISA player profile

1988 births
Living people
Sportspeople from Freetown
Association football goalkeepers
Sherbro people
Sierra Leonean footballers
Sierra Leonean people of British descent
Sierra Leone international footballers
Sportspeople involved in betting scandals
Expatriate soccer players in the United States
Sierra Leonean expatriate footballers
Sierra Leonean expatriate sportspeople in the United States
National Independent Soccer Association players
Maryland Bobcats FC players
Expatriate footballers in Sweden
Sierra Leonean expatriate sportspeople in Sweden
Västerås SK Fotboll players
F.C. Kallon players
Expatriate soccer managers in the United States